Natthaphon Piamplai (born December 5, 1993) is a Thai professional footballer who plays as a midfielder for Thai League 1 club Sukhothai.

References

External links
 at Soccerway

1996 births
Living people
Natthaphon Piamplai
Natthaphon Piamplai
Natthaphon Piamplai
Natthaphon Piamplai
Natthaphon Piamplai
Association football midfielders